Bara is a village and municipality in the Trebišov District in the Košice Region of eastern Slovakia.

History 
In historical records the village was first mentioned in 1296 as  Bary. Until 1920 it was part of Hungary.  From 1938 until 1944 it was occupied by Hungary under the First Vienna Award.

Geography 
The village lies at an altitude of 181 metres and covers an area of 6.252 km².
It has a population of 350 people.

Ethnicity 
The village is approximately 72% Hungarian and 28% Slovak.

Genealogical resources

The records for genealogical research are available at the state archive "Statny Archiv in Kosice, Slovakia"

 Greek Catholic church records (births/marriages/deaths): 1770-1895 (parish B)
 Reformated church records (births/marriages/deaths): 1782-1945 (parish A)

See also
 List of municipalities and towns in Slovakia

External links 
Mestská a obecná štatistika SR
Surnames of living people in Bara

Villages and municipalities in Trebišov District